Law, Legislation and Liberty is a work in three volumes by Nobel laureate economist and political philosopher Friedrich Hayek. In it, Hayek further develops the philosophical principles he discussed earlier in The Road to Serfdom, The Constitution of Liberty, and other writings. Law, Legislation and Liberty is more abstract than Hayek's earlier work, and it focuses on the conflicting views of society as either a design, a made order ("taxis"), on the one hand, or an emergent system, a grown order ("cosmos"), on the other. These ideas are then connected to two different forms of law: law proper, or "nomos" coinciding more or less with the traditional concept of natural law, which is an emergent property of social interaction, and legislation, or "thesis", which is properly confined to the administration of non-coercive government services, but is easily confused with the occasional acts of legislature that do actually straighten out flaws in the nomos.

Contents 
Vol. 1 : Rules and Order (1973)
 Reason and Evolution
 Cosmos and Taxis
 Principles and Expediency
 The Changing Concept of Law
 Nomos: The Law of Liberty
 Thesis: The Law of Legislation
Vol. 2 : The Mirage of Social Justice (1976) 
 General Welfare and Particular Purposes
 The Quest for Justice
 'Social' or Distributive Justice
 The Market Order or Catallaxy
 The Discipline of Abstract Rules and the Emotions of the Tribal Society
Vol. 3 : The Political Order of a Free People (1979)
 Majority Opinion and Contemporary Democracy
 The Division of Democratic Powers
 The Public Sector and the Private Sector
 Government Policy and the Market
 The Miscarriage of the Democratic Ideal: A Recapitulation
 A Model Constitution
 The Containment of Power and the Dethronement of Politics
 Epilogue: The Three Sources of Human Values

See also 
 Austrian School of economics
 Philosophy of law
 Catallaxy

External links
 
 Podcast featuring Prof. Don Boudreaux Donald Boudreaux discusses Law, Legislation and Liberty on EconTalk.

Law Legislation and Liberty
Books by Friedrich Hayek
Classical liberalism
Economics books
Emergence
Libertarian books
Philosophy of law

de:Friedrich August von Hayek#Recht, Gesetz und Freiheit (1979)